"Tough as a Pickup Truck" is a song recorded by Canadian country music artist Jim Witter. It was released in 1999 as the third single from his second studio album, All My Life. It peaked at number 7 on the RPM Country Tracks chart in January 2000.

Chart performance

References

1999 songs
1999 singles
Jim Witter songs
Curb Records singles
Songs written by Jim Witter